Samuel Lawrence (May 23, 1773October 20, 1837) was an American politician from New York.

Early life
He was the son of Jonathan Lawrence and Ruth (Riker) Lawrence. He attended the common schools, studied law with his cousin Attorney General Nathaniel Lawrence, was admitted to the bar, and commenced practice in New York City.  Among his siblings was New York State Senator John L. Lawrence (father of Abraham R. Lawrence) and U.S. Congressman William T. Lawrence.

He was also a direct descendant of Capt. James Lawrence, a hero of the War of 1812, and Maj. Thomas Lawrence of the British Army who received a land grant in 1656 in what became Queens.

Career
He was appointed a judge of the Marine Court of New York City. He was a member of the New York State Assembly (New York Co.) in 1811, and was Clerk of New York County from 1811 to 1812.

In 1814, he removed to an estate on the margin of Cayuta Lake, in Tioga County. He was a presidential elector in 1816 and voted for James Monroe and Daniel D. Tompkins. He was again a member of the State Assembly in 1820-21. Lawrence was elected as an Adams-Clay Democratic-Republican to the 18th United States Congress, holding office from March 4, 1823, to March 3, 1825.

Personal life
His son Samuel Lawrence (1810-1882) was a member of the New York State Assembly from Tompkins County in 1847; and from Schuyler County in 1863.

He was buried in the family cemetery on his estate.

References

The New York Civil List compiled by Franklin Benjamin Hough (pages 71, 185, 197, 287, 321 and 325; Weed, Parsons and Co., 1858)
 Historical Genealogy of the Lawrence Family by Thomas Lawrence

1773 births
1837 deaths
People from Tioga County, New York
People from Elmhurst, Queens
Members of the New York State Assembly
1816 United States presidential electors
Democratic-Republican Party members of the United States House of Representatives from New York (state)